Atriplex nessorhina, the Donald Duck saltbush, is a species of flowering plant in the family Amaranthaceae, native to central South Australia, New South Wales, and southwest Queensland. Its bracteoles have swollen bases and beak-like valves.

References

nessorhina
Endemic flora of Australia
Flora of South Australia
Flora of Queensland
Flora of New South Wales
Plants described in 1983